The USATF Masters Hall of Fame is the Masters section of the National Track and Field Hall of Fame.  It is intended to select worthy athletes from the various divisions of Masters athletics involved in the sports of track and field, road running and race walking. They are selected from nominees proposed by the Hall of Fame Committee, a joint committee under the supervision of the Masters Track and Field (MTF) and Masters Long Distance Running (LDR) committees of USATF, the current national governing body supervising the sport in the United States. First Class was 1996. Voters include the members of the Hall of Fame committee, the Executive Boards of the MTF and LDR and the members of the Hall of Fame itself.

See also

National Distance Running Hall of Fame
RRCA Distance Running Hall of Fame

References

External links
USATF Masters Hall of Fame

Sports halls of fame
Masters athletics (track and field)
Sport of athletics awards
Track and field in New York City
Track
Sports organizations established in 1996
1996 establishments in New York City